Andrii Holivets (born 22 February 1972) is a Paralympian athlete from Ukraine competing mainly in category F11/12 throwing events.

In 2012, Holivets entered the European Championships in Stadskanaal in the Netherlands. There he competed in the F12 shot put, recording a distance of 15.52m which gave him his first major gold medal. Holivets competed in his first Paralympic Games at London in 2012. He competed in the shot put, in the joint F11/F12 event. He threw a distance of 16.25m, converting to 991 points, enough to beat his nearest rival, Russia's Vladimir Andryushchenko into second place.

At the 2013 IPC Athletics World Championships, Holivets again took the gold medal, and for the third time in last three major competitions he left Andryushchenko in silver medal position.

Notes

External links
 

Paralympic athletes of Ukraine
Athletes (track and field) at the 2012 Summer Paralympics
Paralympic gold medalists for Ukraine
Living people
1972 births
Place of birth missing (living people)
Medalists at the 2012 Summer Paralympics
Paralympic medalists in athletics (track and field)
Ukrainian male shot putters
Visually impaired shot putters
Paralympic shot putters